The Waterbury Career Academy is a high school located in the North End section of Waterbury, Connecticut, in the United States. The school consists of four strands. Students are able to pick a strand at the end of their freshman term. It is a part of Waterbury Public Schools. Jade L. Gopie took the role as Principal in August 2020 after former principal Dr. Louis A. Padua announced his retirement. Then in October 2021, Michael Harris, former assistant principal, was promoted to principal after Gopie was promoted to Assistant Superintendent.

As of 2023, School is currently run by Principal Michael Harris and Assistant Principals Jennifer Franceskino and Peter Flammia

Strands 
 Information Technology and Engineering/Business
 Manufacturing
 Education & Training
 Health Sciences

References 
 

 

Schools in Waterbury, Connecticut